In topology, a topological space is called simply connected (or 1-connected, or 1-simply connected) if it is path-connected and every path between two points can be continuously transformed (intuitively for embedded spaces, staying within the space) into any other such path while preserving the two endpoints in question. The fundamental group of a topological space is an indicator of the failure for the space to be simply connected: a path-connected topological space is simply connected if and only if its fundamental group is trivial.

Definition and equivalent formulations

Explicitly, there exists a homotopy  such that  and 

Similarly,  is simply connected if and only if for all points  the set of morphisms  in the fundamental groupoid of  has only one element.

In complex analysis: an open subset  is simply connected if and only if both  and its complement in the Riemann sphere are connected. The set of complex numbers with imaginary part strictly greater than zero and less than one furnishes a nice example of an unbounded, connected, open subset of the plane whose complement is not connected. It is nevertheless simply connected. It might also be worth pointing out that a relaxation of the requirement that  be connected leads to an interesting exploration of open subsets of the plane with connected extended complement. For example, a (not necessarily connected) open set has a connected extended complement exactly when each of its connected components are simply connected.

Informal discussion

Informally, an object in our space is simply connected if it consists of one piece and does not have any "holes" that pass all the way through it. For example, neither a doughnut nor a coffee cup (with a handle) is simply connected, but a hollow rubber ball is simply connected. In two dimensions, a circle is not simply connected, but a disk and a line are. Spaces that are connected but not simply connected are called non-simply connected or multiply connected.

The definition rules out only handle-shaped holes. A sphere (or, equivalently, a rubber ball with a hollow center) is simply connected, because any loop on the surface of a sphere can contract to a point even though it has a "hole" in the hollow center. The stronger condition, that the object has no holes of  dimension, is called contractibility.

Examples

 The Euclidean plane  is simply connected, but  minus the origin  is not. If  then both  and  minus the origin are simply connected.
 Analogously: the n-dimensional sphere  is simply connected if and only if 
 A torus, the (elliptic) cylinder, the Möbius strip, the projective plane and the Klein bottle are not simply connected.
 Every topological vector space is simply connected; this includes Banach spaces and Hilbert spaces.
 For  the special orthogonal group  is not simply connected and the special unitary group  is simply connected.
 The long line  is simply connected, but its compactification, the extended long line  is not (since it is not even path connected).

Properties

A universal cover of any (suitable) space  is a simply connected space which maps to  via a covering map.

The image of a simply connected set under a continuous function need not be simply connected.

The notion of simple connectedness is important in complex analysis because of the following facts: 

The notion of simple connectedness is also a crucial condition in the Poincaré conjecture.

See also

References

Algebraic topology
Properties of topological spaces

de:Zusammenhängender Raum#Einfach zusammenhängend